B. Fernand Nadeau (April 2, 1924 – May 30, 2005) was a Canadian politician. He served in the Legislative Assembly of New Brunswick from 1967 to 1970, as a Liberal member for the constituency of Edmundston. He was also mayor of Edmundston. He died in hospital at Edmundston in 2005.

References

New Brunswick Liberal Association MLAs
1924 births
2005 deaths